Johann Daniel Schöpflin (6 September 1694, Sulzburg – 7 August 1771, Strasbourg) was a professor of history, rhetoric and law at the University of Strasbourg. He was one of Johann Wolfgang von Goethe’s teachers.

Biography 
Schöpflin was well known in Europe and had a sphere of influence that went far beyond Strasbourg. His correspondence provides not only a revealing look at university and academic life of the time, but also at culture and diplomacy in the Age of Enlightenment. His comments on his contemporaries and current events are now an important source for this era. Schöpflin’s correspondents included the scholars of the Sankt Blasien Abbey in the Black Forest, Martin Gerbert and Rustenus Heer. He was elected a Fellow of the Royal Society in 1828.

In 1760 Charles Frederick, Grand Duke of Baden asked Schöpflin to write the von Baden family history.
 
From 1763, Schöpflin was a member of the  Palatine Academy of Sciences  in Mannheim and was its first honorary president.

Schöpflin taught Goethe in 1770 and 1771, imparting to his student a love of history and especially medieval poetry. The Palatine historian Andreas Lamey (1726-1802) was also one of Schöpflin’s students.

Writings 
 Alsatia diplomatica, two volumes, Strasbourg 1772-1775.
 Alsatia Illustrata, two volumes, Colmar 1751-1761.
 Historia Zaringo-Badensis, seven volumes, Karlsruhe 1763-1766.
 Vindiciae Celticae, Strasbourg 1754.

Bibliography 
 Johann Daniel Schöpflin: Wissenschaftliche und diplomatische Korrespondenz (= Beihefte der Francia 54). Edited by Jürgen Voss. Thorbecke, Stuttgart 2002,  (Online).
 Jürgen Voss: Universität, Geschichtswissenschaft und Diplomatie im Zeitalter der Aufklärung. Johann Daniel Schöpflin (1694–1771) (= Veröffentlichungen des Historischen Instituts der Universität Mannheim. Bd. 4). Fink, München 1979,  (Also: Mannheim Universität, Habilitations-Magazine, 1976).

External links 
 Wilhelm Wiegand:Johann Daniel Schöpflin in Allgemeine Deutsche Biographie Volume 32, Duncker & Humblot, Leipzig 1891, p. 359–368.

References 

1694 births
1771 deaths
People from Sulzburg
18th-century German historians
Academic staff of the University of Strasbourg
French bibliophiles
French historiographers
Fellows of the Royal Society